This is a list of women artists who were born in the United Arab Emirates or whose artworks are closely associated with that country.

A
Ebtisam AbdulAziz (active since 2005), contemporary artist
 Al Anood Al Obaidly (req. pre-2017-11-14), visual artist;

M
Najat Makki (born 1956), visual artist
Wafa Hasher Al Maktoum (active since 2009), artist, curator

S
Maisoon Al Saleh (born 1988), painter, sculptor

-
Emirati women artists, List of
Artists
Artists